Sir John Philipps, 6th Baronet PC (c. 1701 – 22 June 1764) was a Welsh Jacobite politician.

Sir John was the son of Sir John Philipps, 4th Baronet.  He studied at Pembroke College, Oxford, and went on to Lincoln's Inn.

In 1736 he was elected mayor of Haverfordwest and in 1741 he became MP for Carmarthen. In 1743, his elder brother, Sir Erasmus Philipps, 5th Baronet, was accidentally drowned, and Sir John inherited the baronetcy and Picton Castle. He gave up the Carmarthenshire seat in 1747, but re-entered Parliament as MP for Petersfield (1754–1761), and Pembrokeshire (1761–1764). In 1763 he became a privy counsellor.

A patron of education, he founded several scholarships at his former Oxford college. Proposed by his elder brother, he was elected a Fellow of the Royal Society in 1742.

In 1725, he married Elizabeth, the daughter of Henry Shepherd of London, with whom he had a son and 3 daughters. Among the family's servants was Cesar Picton, a former slave from Senegal, who later became a successful coal merchant in Kingston upon Thames, Surrey. The family lived for many years at Norbiton Place, an estate just outside Kingston, and Sir John died here on 22 June 1764. He was succeeded by the son, Richard, who was created Baron Milford in 1776.

References

Philipps family of Picton. Welsh Biography Online

1700s births
1764 deaths
Alumni of Pembroke College, Oxford
Baronets in the Baronetage of England
British MPs 1741–1747
British MPs 1754–1761
British MPs 1761–1768
Lord-Lieutenants of Haverfordwest
Members of Lincoln's Inn
Members of the Parliament of Great Britain for English constituencies
Members of the Parliament of Great Britain for Welsh constituencies
Members of the Privy Council of Great Britain
Fellows of the Royal Society
Mayors of places in Wales